Thomas Green  (born 3 June 1999) is an Australian sprint canoeist. He won a gold medal in the K2 1000 metres event at the 2020 Summer Olympics, competing alongside Jean van der Westhuyzen. He also competed in the K1 1000 metres in Tokyo, finishing in seventh place.

In 2018, he won the K2 1000m with Joel McKitterick at the World Under 23 Championships in Plovdiv, Bulgaria and followed it up with wins in the 2019 Championships in Pitesti, Romania in the Under 23 K1 1000m and K4 500m events.

Green was only 10 years old when he started kayaking at the Currumbin Creek Canoe Club. He was encouraged to concentrate on flat-water paddling. He competed at the Australian Canoe Sprint Championships, winning eleven medals, three of which were gold medals.

In the 2022 Australia Day Honours Green was awarded the Medal of the Order of Australia.

References

External links
 

1999 births
Living people
Australian male canoeists
Sportsmen from Queensland
Olympic canoeists of Australia
Canoeists at the 2020 Summer Olympics
Medalists at the 2020 Summer Olympics
Olympic gold medalists for Australia
Olympic medalists in canoeing
Recipients of the Medal of the Order of Australia
ICF Canoe Sprint World Championships medalists in kayak
21st-century Australian people